The After Party: The Last Party 3 is a 2011 documentary feature film about a cinematographer (Michael Schiller) who is caught in a mass arrest while filming 2004 Republican National Convention protest activity near ground zero at the World Trade Center.

The film is the third in a series of documentaries, The Last Party and The Party's Over.

Reception
The After Party: The Last Party 3 has won several awards and has screened across the United States. It has also received favorable reviews.

Accolades

References

External links 
 
 

2011 films
American documentary films
2011 documentary films
Films set in 2004
Documentary films about law enforcement in the United States
Documentary films about human rights
Documentary films about law in the United States
Documentary films about New York City
2004 Republican National Convention
Films produced by Donovan Leitch (actor)
2010s English-language films
2010s American films